Pranali Rathod (born 15 October 1996) is an Indian actress who primarily works in Hindi television. Rathod is best known for her portrayal of Saudamini Bhaumik in Barrister Babu, Radha Sahani in Kyun Utthe Dil Chhod Aaye and Akshara Goenka Birla in Yeh Rishta Kya Kehlata Hai.

Early life
Rathod was born on 15 October 1996 and brought up in Maharashtra.

Career
Rathod made her acting debut in 2018 with Pyaar Pehli Baar. She portrayed Saanvi in the show's first episode.

In 2019, she portrayed Suman Pandey in Jaat Na Poocho Prem Ki opposite Kinshuk Vaidya. It marked her fiction debut.

She then portrayed Saudamini Bhaumik Greenwood in Barrister Babu in 2020, opposite Pravisht Mishra and Jason Shah.

In 2021, she portrayed Radha Sahani in Kyun Utthe Dil Chhod Aaye opposite Yash Tonk. In the same year, she made her web debut with Chutzpah, where she portrayed Richa.

Since October 2021, Rathod is seen portraying Akshara Goenka Birla in Yeh Rishta Kya Kehlata Hai opposite Harshad Chopda. The show proved as a major turning point in her career. She received ITA Award for Best Actress Popular for her performance.

In 2022, Rathod reprised Akshara Goenka Birla in the game show Ravivaar With Star Parivaar.

Media image
In 2023, Rathod was placed in Eastern Eyes "30 under 30 Asians" list.

Filmography

Television

Web series

Music videos

Awards and nominations

See also
 List of Hindi television actresses
 List of Indian television actresses

References

External links

Indian television actresses
Living people
Indian actresses
21st-century Indian actresses
Actresses from Mumbai
1996 births